Events in the year 1879 in Spain.

Incumbents
Monarch: Alfonso XII
Prime Minister: Antonio Cánovas del Castillo

Events
April 20 - Spanish general election, 1879

Births
February 20 - Pedro Muñoz Seca
August 14 - Marcelino Valentín Gamazo
November 14 - Antonio Escobar Huertas

Deaths
Juan de Zavala, 1st Marquis of Sierra Bullones

References

 
1870s in Spain